The Women's American Basketball Association (WABA) is a league that began in 2017 with seven teams. It now has over 20 teams across the country. Season 4 was cancelled in the face of the COVID-19 pandemic in 2020. There have been previous women's professional basketball leagues in the United States known by the same name and a similar name, the Women's Basketball Association, some of which are described below, but the current league is not a continuation of any of those and is unrelated to them in any way other than by similarity of name and the sport played.

WABA (1984) 
The first Women's American Basketball Association was founded by Bill Byrne, founder of the Women's Professional Basketball League (WBL), in hopes of cashing in on the USA Olympic team's success in Los Angeles in 1984. While some talented players played in the league (including Nancy Lieberman, Molly Bolin, Pamela McGee and Paula McGee) most of the league's teams folded before the league championship, which was won by Dallas over Chicago.

WWBA/WBA (1992–95) 
The Women's Basketball Association (WBA) was the first women's professional basketball summer league. The league was called the WWBA and WBA for the first All-Star tour in 1992, before settling on WBA. The pioneer league was formed in 1992 by Lightning N Mitchell and played three full seasons from 1993–95.

The WBA played a 15-game schedule, and games were broadcast on Liberty Sports of Dallas. The All-Star games were also televised on Fox Sports. Kansas Jayhawks All-American Geri "Kay-Kay" Hart and Robelyn "Robbie" Garcia announced the game on Fox Radio and Nancy Lieberman was the TV announcer for the 1995 All-Star game.

The WBA played three full seasons, with plans to play as a 12-team league in 1997, but disbanded before the season began. When Fox Sports purchased Liberty Sports and the WBA, they dissolved the league shortly after and sold off the franchising rights. The league was the first American professional women's basketball league to be successful as a summer league, like their counterpart Women's National Basketball Association (WNBA).

Guard Laurie Byrd played for the WWBA, WBA, American Basketball League and the WNBA.

WBA Champions 
 1993 – Kansas Crusaders – MVP: Robelyn Garcia
 1994 – Nebraska Express – MVP: Maurtice Ivy (Tice)
 1995 – Chicago Twisters – MVP: Diana Vines

1993 WBA regular season

World Conference

American Conference

MVP: Sarah Campbell

WBA 1st Round Playoffs
Missouri 2–1 over Iowa
Iowa 119, Missouri 103
Missouri 98, Iowa 93
Missouri 117, Iowa 112 (OT)

Kansas 2–0 over Oklahoma
Kansas 92, Oklahoma 77
Kansas 114, Oklahoma 64

Nebraska 2–0 over Illinois
Nebraska 166, Illinois 129
Nebraska 127, Illinois 115

WBA 2nd Round Playoffs
Kansas 2–0 over Missouri
Kansas 121, Missouri 97
Kansas 109, Missouri 99

1993 WBA Championship (best-of five)
Kansas 3–1 over Nebraska
Kansas 125, Nebraska 119
Nebraska 118, Kansas 100
Kansas 111, Nebraska 96
First WBA Championship: Kansas 100, Nebraska 98
MVP: Robelyn "Robbie" Garcia1994 WBA regular season

National Conference

American ConferenceMVP: Evette Ott, Sarah CampbellWBA 1st Round PlayoffsMemphis 2–0 over St. LouisMemphis 126, St. Louis 111
Memphis 122, St. Louis 110Indiana 2–0 over OklahomaIndiana 107, Oklahoma 91
Indiana 103, Oklahoma 91WBA 2nd Round Playoffs (Best out of 2 or the total number of points score in 2 games)Memphis won series in Points (195–185)Kansas City 98, Memphis 94
Memphis 101, Kansas City 87Nebraska won series by winning 2–0 over IndianaNebraska 99, Indiana 89
Nebraska 91, Indiana 871994 WBA Championship (best-of five)Nebraska 3–2 over MemphisMemphis 102, Nebraska 101
Nebraska 123, Memphis 108
Memphis 138, Nebraska 128
Nebraska 111, Memphis 101
Nebraska 103, Memphis 101MVP: Maurtice (Tice) Ivy

1995 WBA regular season

National Conference

American Conference

MVP: Evette Ott, Sarah Campbell

1995 Last WBA Championship Game
Chicago 107, St. Louis 96
Co-MVP: Diana Vines & Petra Jackson

WABA (2001–02) 
The Women's American Basketball Association (WABA) formed in 2001 and played one season in 2002. Six teams played in the league: Allentown Crunch, Reading Rage, Schuylkill Syrens, Scranton/Wilkes-Barre Scream, Wilmington Jaguars and York City Noise.

The 2002 championship game was played June 2, 2002, and won by the York City Noise. Meggan Yedsena (who went on to play for the Colorado Chill) led the Schuylkill Syrens in the league's inaugural season. Some of the teams made the transition to the WEBA and continue to play semi-professional Basketball. Yedsena was the only player to play in both the 1990s WABA (for Nebraska) and the 2002 WABA.

WABA (2017–present) 
Management of the modern-day men’s semi-professional American Basketball Association (ABA) are attempting to create a "new" WABA.

WABA Champions

Notable players
 Nancy Lieberman, Janice Lawrence Braxton, Molly Bolin, Pamela McGee and Paula McGee
 Krista Blunk, Lisa Braddy, Laurie Byrd, Sarah Campbell, Lisa Carlsen, Joy Champ, Surina Dixon, Cledella Evans, Crystal Flint, Robbie Garcia, Kay Kay Hart, Michelle Clark-Heard, Patty Jo Hedges, Petra Jackson, Patrice Marshall, Evette Ott, Angie Paccione, Lynn Page, Lisa Sandbothe, Danielle Shareef, Melissa Stanford, Lisa Tate, Diana Vines, Tammy Williams, Cynthia Wilson, and Meggan Yedsena

References

External links
 1995 All-Star Photos
 Beckett Cards
 Professional basketball research
 WABA 2002 news by OurSportsCentral
 Women's Pro Basketball video

2002 establishments in the United States
Women's basketball leagues in the United States
Professional sports leagues in the United States